Salagena fetlaworkae is a moth in the family Cossidae. It is found in Ethiopia.

References

Natural History Museum Lepidoptera generic names catalog

Endemic fauna of Ethiopia
Metarbelinae
Moths described in 1977